Oslo Spektrum is a multi-purpose indoor arena located in east central Oslo, Norway that opened in December 1990. It is currently owned and operated by Nova Spektrum, formerly Norges Varemesse. Oslo Spektrum is primarily known for hosting major events such as the annual Nobel Peace Prize Concert, the Eurovision Song Contest 1996, and concerts by artists of national and international fame.

History

Construction and opening 

Oslo Spektrum was part of a large-scale redevelopment of the formerly industrial Grønland/Vaterland area. It was developed and designed by LPO Arkitektkontor AS, and its exterior walls were decorated with ceramic tiles containing fragments of prints by the artist Rolf Nesch. Since this artist died in 1975, permission was obtained from his living relatives, and the decorating was supervised by painter Guttorm Guttormsgaard and ceramic artist Søren Ubisch. In 2004, Oslo Spektrum was awarded the Oslo City Council's award for outstanding architectural achievement.

At the time of opening it was Norway's largest indoor arena, with a seated capacity of 9,700 for concerts (which can be increased to 11,500 when combined with a standing audience) and 6,500 during sporting events. In Greater Oslo both Vallhall Arena and Telenor Arena provide larger venues, although both of these were primarily designed to host football matches. 

Oslo Spektrum was conceived as a multi-purpose arena although it was intended primarily for ice hockey and featured built-in ice making facilities. In this capacity it was intended as the home of both Vålerenga Ishockey and Furuset Ishockey, but this did not work out as expected. From 1994 to 1996, it was the home arena of the elite series professional ice hockey team, Spektrum Flyers, but the arena proved too large and too expensive for the club, which was subsequently relocated to Bergen. As a result, the arena was left to rely on other means of generating revenue.

Development and renovation 
In June 2017, the owner notified Norges Varemesse that they were planning to renovate and expand the arena for more than NOK 1 billion. Among other things, a new congress centre is expected to be built in the city with around 3,000 seats and a total of 20,000 additional square metres. The development was scheduled to start in 2020, and the new centre was expected to open in 2023. The goal of the development is to make Oslo better equipped to be Scandinavia's "conference capital". Today's concert hall, with an audience capacity of approx. 10,000 seats, should be refurbished and include 1,700 extra seats. The renovation work was scheduled to start in the summer of 2019, but has since been delayed to 2024–2027.

Location 

One of Oslo Spektrum's prime attributes is its location in the middle of Downtown Oslo, next to the Central Station, long and medium haul bus terminal, Jernbanetorget public transportation hub and only a short distance from international ferry terminals. This makes it easily accessible and minimises traffic problems when crowds arrive at events and disperse afterwards, which has been an issue with other venues such as the more remotely located Telenor Arena.

Events 
Oslo Spektrum was designed to accommodate various types of entertainment shows and sporting events.

While the arena is now rarely used for ice hockey, it regularly hosts ice shows like Disney on Ice. It also hosts the Norwegian Handball Championships, for a period becoming Norway's largest handball arena. Other notable events that have been regularly held here include the Nobel Peace Prize Concert, Norwegian Idol finals, Spellemannsprisen (Norwegian music awards), the Norwegian Military Tattoo, Norwegian song contests Melodi Grand Prix and Melodi Grand Prix Junior, and the Oslo Horse Show.

Currently, Spektrum hosts a total of 100 events annually, with some 400,000 visitors. Of these, 70% are concerts by major national and international artists, 10% are other types of entertainment shows, 13% are fairs, conferences and corporate events, and only 3% are sporting events.

Artists such as Taylor Swift, Bob Dylan, Alan Walker, Toto, Frank Sinatra, Peter Gabriel, Depeche Mode, Nine Inch Nails, The Prodigy, The Cure, Whitney Houston, Shirley Bassey, Tina Turner, Cher, Mariah Carey, Diana Ross, Britney Spears, Backstreet Boys, Kylie Minogue, Janet Jackson, Shania Twain, Westlife, Selena Gomez, Christina Aguilera, Anastacia, Spice Girls, Lady Gaga, Michael Bublé, Lana Del Rey, Green Day, Metallica, Muse, Rammstein, a-ha, Red Hot Chili Peppers, Snoop Dogg, Ariana Grande, Nicki Minaj and Marcus & Martinus have performed at the venue.

See also
 List of indoor arenas in Norway
 List of indoor arenas in Nordic countries

References

External links 

 

Sports venues in Oslo
Indoor arenas in Norway
Indoor ice hockey venues in Norway
Handball venues in Norway
Music venues in Oslo
Event venues established in 1990
1990 establishments in Norway
Vålerenga Ishockey
Spektrum Flyers
Sports venues completed in 1990